Frederick Charles Sharpe (born 6 November 1937) is an English former professional footballer who played for Tottenham Hotspur, Norwich City and Reading.

Playing career
Sharpe joined Tottenham Hotspur as a junior in May 1956. The central defender featured in two matches and scored one goal for the Spurs in 1958–59.

Post–football career
After retiring from competitive football, Sharpe became a school football coach. He was later employed as a salesman before establishing a car valeting concern.

References

1937 births
Living people
Footballers from Brockley
English footballers
English Football League players
Tottenham Hotspur F.C. players
Norwich City F.C. players
Reading F.C. players
Association football central defenders